Duncan Bruce MacMillan (August 27, 1887 – December 20, 1962) was a provincial politician from Alberta, Canada. He served as a member of the Legislative Assembly of Alberta from 1935 to 1952, sitting with the Social Credit caucus in government.

References

Alberta Social Credit Party MLAs
1962 deaths
1887 births
Members of the Executive Council of Alberta